Senna macranthera is a tree in the family of Fabaceae.

With a height of 6 to 9 m, it has an abundance of yellow flowers from December to April in its homelands.

Origin
It originates in the north of South America.

External links 
 
 Senna macranthera  (DC. ex Collad.) H.S. Irwin et Barneby, at Tela Botanica

marilandica